The Finnish Figure Skating Association (FFSA) (STLL) is the national association for figure skating in Finland.

The FFS has its origins in the Finnish Skating Association (Suomen Luisteluliitto) which was formed in 1908 as an umbrella association for both figure and speed skaters. In 1960, Suomen Kaunoluisteluliitto (Finnish Beauty Skating Association) was formed for figure skating disciplines and it changed its name in 1968 to the present to reflect the change in terminology – figure skating (taitoluistelu) was formerly known in Finnish as kaunoluistelu.

The Finnish Figure Skating Association is a member federation of the International Skating Union. The association's headquarters are currently in Helsinki.

See also
 Finnish Figure Skating Championships
 Finnish Synchronized Skating Championships

References

External links
 Official homepage of the Finnish Figure Skating Association

Finland
Figure skating
Figure skating in Finland
Sports organizations established in 1960